Vice Admiral Sir Robert William Frank Gerken  (11 June 1932 – 20 December 2022) was a British Royal Navy officer who served as Flag Officer, Plymouth.

Naval career
Educated at Chigwell School, the Royal Naval College, Dartmouth and the Royal Naval College, Greenwich, Gerken joined the Royal Navy in 1948. He became Commanding Officer of the frigate HMS Andromeda as well as Captain of the 6th Frigate Squadron in 1974. He went on to become Captain of the Fleet in 1978, Flag Officer, Second Flotilla in 1981 and Director-General, Naval Manpower and Training in 1983. His last appointment was as Flag Officer Plymouth and Port Admiral, HMNB Devonport in 1985 before he retired in 1987.

In retirement he became Chairman of Plymouth Development Corporation.

Personal life and death
In 1966 he married Christine Stephenson; they had two daughters. Following the death of his first wife he married Ann Fermor (née Blythe) in 1983.

Gerken died on 20 December 2022, at the age of 90.

References

1932 births
2022 deaths
Royal Navy vice admirals
Knights Commander of the Order of the Bath
Commanders of the Order of the British Empire
Graduates of Britannia Royal Naval College
Graduates of the Royal Naval College, Greenwich
People educated at Chigwell School